Edochie  is an Igbo surname meaning "replacement". Notable people with the surname include:

 Pete Edochie, veteran Nigerian actor
 Rita Edochie, Nigerian actress
 Yul Edochie, Nigerian actor

References 

Igbo-language surnames